Berlikovo is a rural locality (a village) in Gorodetskoye Rural Settlement, Kichmengsko-Gorodetsky District, Vologda Oblast, Russia. The population was 13 as of 2002.

Geography 
Berlikovo is located 13 km southwest of Kichmengsky Gorodok (the district's administrative centre) by road. Shonga is the nearest rural locality.

References 

Rural localities in Kichmengsko-Gorodetsky District